Joseph Palmer (1749–1829) was an Irish Anglican priest in the late 18th century and the first decades of the 19th.

Matriculating at Exeter College, Oxford in 1766, aged 16, he graduated B.A. in 1770, and M.A. in 1772. He was ordained as deacon on 25 September 1774 by Bishop Frederick Keppel to the office of curate at Langtree on a stipend of £40 per year. He was ordained as priest of St James Parish Church by Bishop Jonathan Shipley on 5 May 1776.

He was Chancellor of Ferns from 1779 to 1802. In 1787  he became Dean of Cashel  and in 1802 Precentor of Waterford,  holding both posts until his death on 2 May 1829.

References

Deans of Cashel
18th-century Irish Anglican priests
19th-century Irish Anglican priests
1829 deaths